

Wilhelm Schneckenburger (30 March 1891 – 14 October 1944) was a general in the Wehrmacht of Nazi Germany during World War II who commanded the XVII Army Corps. He was a recipient of the Knight's Cross of the Iron Cross. Schneckenburger was killed in action on 14 October 1944.

Awards and decorations

 Knight's Cross of the Iron Cross on 1 August 1942 as Generalleutnant and commander of 125. Infanterie Division

References

Citations

Bibliography

 

1891 births
1944 deaths
German Army generals of World War II
Generals of Infantry (Wehrmacht)
German Army personnel of World War I
Recipients of the clasp to the Iron Cross, 1st class
German Army personnel killed in World War II
Recipients of the Gold German Cross
Recipients of the Knight's Cross of the Iron Cross
People from Tübingen
People from the Kingdom of Württemberg
Reichswehr personnel
Military personnel from Baden-Württemberg